Enea Koliçi (born 13 February 1986) is an Albanian professional footballer who plays as a goalkeeper for KF Gjilani.

Koliçi started his career in Iraklis' youth squads. He also played for Olympiacos Volou, Odysseas Kordeliou, Panserraikos and Flamurtari Vlorë before returning to Iraklis in the summer of 2013.

He has also been capped with Albania under-21 team.

Club career

Early career
He began his career with Iraklis and was loaned out to Beta Ethniki club Olympiacos Volou in January 2009. Since January 2010 is playing for Olympiacos Volou after being released from Iraklis Thessaloniki FC. He was released by Olympiacos Volou in the summer of 2010 and he ended up in the 4th tier club Odysseas Kordeliou. On 10 June 2011, he signed for Panserraikos on a free transfer.

Flamurtari Vlorë
In January 2012, Koliçi returned to his country and joined Albanian Superliga outfit Flamurtari Vlorë as a free agent, signing until the end of the season. He made his first ever Albanian Superliga appearance on 11 February in the away match against Kamza, keeping a clean sheet as Flamuratri won 1–0. Following the debut, he became first choice in goal and retained his spot until the end of the season, collecting 19 appearances, including 13 in league, as Flamurtari finished 4th in league, qualifying in the 2012–13 UEFA Europa League first qualifying round, and was eliminated in the semi-finals of Albanian Cup by Tirana.

He made his European debut with the team on 5 July 2012 in the first leg against Honvéd. He also played in the returning leg on 12th, as Flamurtari suffered another defeat and was eliminated the aggregate 3–0. Three days later, Koliçi agreed a contract extension, signing until June 2013.

Return to Iraklis
On 1 August 2013 he signed a two-year contract with Iraklis. He had to wait until 26 January of the following year to make his return debut, where he kept a clean sheet in an away win against Anagennisi Giannitsa.

Olympiacos Volou
On 24 July 2014 Koliçi signed for Olympiacos Volou. He made his competitive debut on 12 October 2014 in the 0–2 home defeat to Zakynthos. During the course of 2014–15 season, Koliçi shared his spot with Alexandros Kasmeridis and Dimitris Rizos, and finished the season with only 8 league appearances, failing to keep a clean sheet.

Kukësi

On 24 August 2015, Koliçi completed a transfer to Albanian Superliga side Kukësi by agreeing a one-year deal after initially refused to be on trial. He spent the first part of the season as Ervis Koçi's backup, and was used only in Albanian Cup where he made his debut in the first round against Naftëtari Kuçovë. His league debut would come later on 5 March of the following year in Kukësi's defeat of Vllaznia in Shkodër, entering in the 5th minute in place of injured Koçi. Koliçi retained his spot until the end of the season, making 13 league appearances, in addition 8 in Albanian Cup, including one in final where Kukësi defeated Laçi on penalties.

Koliçi started his second Kukësi season on 30 June 2016 in first leg of UEFA Europa League first qualifying round against Rudar which ended in a 1–1 home draw. He kept a clean sheet in the returning leg as Kukësi progressed to the second round with the 2–1 aggregate. Kukësi then was eliminated in the second round by Austria Wien with the aggregate 5–1. On 5 August 2016, he extended his contract for another year. Later on 24 August, Koliçi begun the domestic season by playing in the 2016 Albanian Supercup against Skënderbeu Korçë, where Kukësi emerged victorious at Selman Stërmasi Stadium, aiding the club to win its first ever Albanian Supercup trophy.

Koliçi played 28 league games during the 2017–18 season; he lost his starting place to Stivi Frashëri in mid-March 2018 following the arrival of manager Peter Pacult. He played his 100th Albanian Superliga match on 28 February in the 2–2 home draw against Skënderbeu Korçë.

On 6 July 2017, Koliçi was not included in the UEFA Champions League squad for the first qualifying round tie versus Malta's Valletta. The following day he announced to have terminated the contract with the club and becoming a free agent.

Return to Flamurtari Vlorë
On 26 July 2018, Koliçi signed a one-year contract with Flamurtari, returning in Vlorë after five years.

Skënderbeu Korçë
In August 2019, Koliçi joined Skënderbeu Korçë as a free agent on a contract for the 2019–20 season. He made his debut in the opening championship week against his former side Flamurtari Vlorë on 24 August, keeping a clean-sheet in a 1–0 win at home.

Gjilani
On 29 July 2020, Koliçi joined Football Superleague of Kosovo side Gjilani, on a two-year contract.

International career
Koliçi has made 12 appearances for Albania under-21 squad. He was part of the team in the qualifiers of 2009 UEFA European Under-21 Championship. After remaining on the bench in the first two matches, Koliçi was handed his debut on 8 September 2007 in the match against Croatia where he kept a clean sheet in an eventual 1–0 win. He second appearance came in the next match against Azerbaijan as Albania didn't get more than a 1–1 draw at Baku. Koliçi finished the campaign by making 7 appearances as Albania finished Group 1 in 4th position, failing thus to qualify for the main tournament.

He received his first senior call up at Albania senior team for the friendly match against Georgia on 10 June 2009, where he featured in the game but was an unused substitute for the entire match.

Koliçi returned to the national team after eight years in October 2017 to replace the injured Thomas Strakosha for the final 2018 FIFA World Cup qualification matches versus Spain and Italy. He was placed as the third goalkeeper and remained on the bench in both matches.

Career statistics

Club

Honours

Club
Kukësi
 Albanian Cup: 2015–16
 Albanian Supercup: 2016
 Albanian Superliga: 2016–17

Individual
Albanian Superliga Player of the Month: February 2017

References

External links

Enea Koliçi at the Albanian Football Association

1986 births
Living people
People from Pogradec
Albanian emigrants to Greece
Association football goalkeepers
Albanian footballers
Albania youth international footballers
Albania under-21 international footballers
Iraklis Thessaloniki F.C. players
Olympiacos Volos F.C. players
Panserraikos F.C. players
Flamurtari Vlorë players
FK Kukësi players
KF Skënderbeu Korçë players
Football League (Greece) players
Kategoria Superiore players
Kategoria e Dytë players
Albanian expatriate footballers
Albanian expatriate sportspeople in Greece
Expatriate footballers in Greece